The statue of Hans Joachim von Zieten is a bronze sculpture installed at Wilhelmplatz in Berlin, Germany.

See also

 Statue of Leopold I, Prince of Anhalt-Dessau

References

External links
 

Bronze sculptures in Germany
Statues in Berlin
Outdoor sculptures in Berlin
Sculptures of men in Germany
Statues in Germany
Mitte